Scum is a 1977 British television play written by Roy Minton and directed by Alan Clarke. It was intended to be screened as part of the Play for Today series. Instead the production was banned by the BBC after it was completed in 1977, and not aired until BBC 2 showed it on 27 July 1991. In the interim, a theatrical film version was released in 1979. The original version features Ray Winstone (in one of his earliest roles), John Blundell, David Threlfall, Martin Phillips, Phil Daniels and Davidson Knight.

Plot 
Three young delinquents, Carlin, Davis and Angel, are escorted via van to a British borstal. (The title sequence shows Davis trying to escape from an "open" borstal and being rounded up by the warders.)

Once they arrive, they are given rooms. Angel and Davis are allotted private rooms whilst Carlin has to stay in a dormitory. Carlin, who was transferred from another borstal as punishment for attacking an officer, is thoroughly told by the senior officer Mr. Sands that he expects no trouble and he will be severely punished for any transgressions. Shortly afterwards, Carlin strikes up a friendship with Archer, an intellectual (albeit eccentric) inmate who does everything he can to annoy the administration and its warders. Meanwhile, Banks, the "daddy" (head inmate) of the wing is informed of Carlin's reputation and told to keep him in line. That night, Banks and his crony Richards assault Carlin, leaving his face bruised. Due to this, he is mistakenly accused of fighting by Sands and given three days solitary confinement as punishment.

After serving his punishment, Carlin seeks revenge on Banks and Richards by first attacking Richards and then beating Banks and effectively replacing him as the "daddy" of the wing. Carlin then makes a deal with house officer Mr. Goodyear. In exchange for a single room cell, Carlin will use his "natural leader" skills to keep peace in the wing. Carlin asks a new inmate named Rhodes to be his "missus", although Carlin stresses he is not homosexual.

A short while after, whilst Davis is working in the greenhouse, he is assaulted and gang raped by a group of boys. Sands looks in the window and sees the rape, but merely smiles and walks away. Later that night, Davis, traumatised by the rape, asks warder Mr. Greaves for help but is merely berated by him. Davis later slashes his wrists in his cell and dies as a result. His body is found the next morning by Sands.

The following day during breakfast, the boys refuse to eat in protest against Davis' death. Carlin then incites a riot. (Ray Winstone recalled that he and several others intended to give John Judd a real beating in the scene, as he had taken a bit too well to his role as the brutal warder Sands, but Judd got wind of the plan and scrambled to get out of the messhall - which only added to the effect of the riot.)

Later, Carlin, Archer and several others are led away by guards, handcuffed. The Governor of the borstal makes an announcement to all the inmates stating he will tolerate no further outbursts. He then declares a minute silent prayer in Davis' memory. In a grimly ironic touch, the boys who raped Davis are in the front row of the assembly.

Cast

Inmates

Borstal staff

Ban
To protect against possible trouble, considerable research was undertaken to establish the authenticity of the drama, although executives in the corporation considered it unrealistic, according to Play for Today producer Margaret Matheson, because of the potential confusion between documentary and drama because of the detailed representation. An 'Early Warning Synopsis' practice existed in the BBC between producers and their superiors whereby details of a programme's content was communicated. In the case of Scum, this had been seen by the controller of BBC 1, Bryan Cowgill, without any problems being raised. A change in personnel, with Bill Cotton succeeding Cowgill, soon led to difficulties in October 1977 when the completed work was awaiting its now scheduled transmission.

Some cuts were made at Cotton's request, an earlier suicide was removed; those involved in the play hoped the edits would prevent it being banned, but  no avail. The play was not transmitted at the time. Matheson managed to screen the film for the press, outside the BBC in a Soho preview theatre, which did result in press coverage about the suppression, not necessarily favourable to Scum itself. At the screening, Minton dubbed the production the 'Billy Cotton Banned Show' after the light-entertainment programme Billy Cotton Band Show, hosted by the BBC executive's father.

See also 
 Made in Britain

References

External links
Scum (TV drama) at the BFI's Screenonline

1977 television films
1977 films
1977 television plays
1991 television films
1991 films
British television plays
Play for Today
Suicide in television
1990s English-language films
1970s English-language films